The Jaguar XE (X760) is a rear or all-wheel drive, front-engine, four-door compact executive car manufactured and marketed by Jaguar Land Rover, under their Jaguar marque. The successor to the X-Type, it was designed by Ian Callum and launched at the October 2014 Paris Motor Show. Production started in April 2015.

The XE is noted for its aluminium suspension componentry as well as its bonded and riveted aluminium unitary structure — the first in its segment.

Launch
The XE was announced, but not displayed, at the 2014 Geneva Motor Show and debuted globally on 8 September 2014 in London. Sales were expected to begin globally in 2015, followed by the United States in 2016. Production formally commenced on 13 April 2015 at Jaguar Land Rover's Solihull plant.

Production
The XE was the first Jaguar to be built at the factory in Solihull, which was to be dedicated to the manufacture of aluminium vehicles under both the Jaguar and Land Rover brands, including the second-generation Range Rover Sport. Due to high demand for the vehicle production capacity was increased by adding a line at Castle Bromwich Assembly. Production transferred completely to Castle Bromwich in 2017 as part of a £100m refit.

An extended-wheelbase version—exclusively for the Chinese market—called XEL commenced production at the Chery Jaguar Land Rover plant in Changshu in 2015.

Engines
The XE was the first application of Jaguar Land Rover's new 2.0 L turbocharged Ingenium four-cylinder engine. The Ingenium technology licenses the Multiair/UniAir electrohydraulic variable valve lift system from Schaeffler Group, which Schaeffler in turn licensed from Fiat Chrysler Automobiles in 2001. The system, developed by Fiat Powertrain Technologies, is a hydraulically-actuated variable valve lift (VVL) technology enabling "cylinder by cylinder, stroke by stroke" control of intake air directly via a gasoline engine's inlet valves.

The four-cylinder is available in both petrol and diesel variants, in a range of different power outputs. The cleanest models in Britain pay no annual Vehicle Excise Duty.

From the XE's launch until 2017 the petrol four-cylinders were from Ford's family of "EcoBoost" engines. New Ingenium petrol engines replaced the Ford units beginning in the 2018 model year.

From the XE's launch until 2019 the petrol V6 was from Jaguar's family of AJ-V8 engines. And, after 2019 the V6 engine was no longer offered.

Design

Exterior
Ian Callum designed the XE's exterior. The construction features bonded and riveted aluminium construction, with bolt-on front and rear crash structure and key body panels to simplify repair and decrease insurance costs. In the event of a collision with a pedestrian, the active bonnet pops up to provide additional protection.

The exterior design has a drag co-efficient of 0.26.

Interior

The interior features a flush rotary gear selector which raises and becomes functional once the engine is started. The XE features smartphone connectivity and some models allow the owner to pre-heat the interior or unlock the car remotely, using a smartphone application. A laser colour head-up display is an available option.

Interior revisions in 2017 include cupholder covers, revised and higher resolution display and standard infotainment interface marketed as In-Control Touch Pro reliant on a user-provided data connection Sim card.

In 2019, the interior was revised with new door panels, center tunnel, and a revised infotainment system marketed as In-Control Touch Pro Duo and shared with other Jaguar Land Rover products. The automatic's rotary knob gear selector was replaced with a more conventional type marketed as the Sport Shift Selector.

Construction

Platform

The XE is the first built on the Jaguar Land Rover iQ[Al] (D7a) modular platform, also used for the second generation Jaguar XF (X260) model, the Jaguar F-Pace sports utility vehicle and the Range Rover Velar. The design features double wishbone suspension at the front, with similarities to the system fitted to the XF and F-Type models, the rear features an entirely new subframe mounted multi-link suspension system, marketed as Integral Link. The system costlier to manufacture but allows for greater tuning.

The major suspension components are manufactured from aluminium to reduce the unsprung as well as overall vehicle mass and increase the suspension system stiffness. The suspension system features sacrificial slip-fixings to protect expensive major components from damage. To create the 50:50 weight balance the battery is located in the trunk/boot, consuming space normally accommodating the spare wheel. The rear boot floor and boot lid are steel, contributing to balanced weight distribution.

Single-piston brake calipers are provided with one of three different sizes of brake discs fitted, depending on the vehicle's configuration. An electric power steering system is fitted and the XE comes with a choice of four different road wheel sizes. Initially there were eight available alloy wheel designs.

Transmission

Initially offered with rear-wheel drive, the D7a modular architecture was designed to accommodate all-wheel drive (AWD), which was offered in November 2015, to compete with Audi Quattro, BMW xDrive and Mercedes-Benz 4MATIC models.

All XE models are equipped with a ZF 8HP45 or ZF 8HP70 eight-speed automatic transmission, a lighter variant of the gearbox currently fitted to other Jaguar models and the competing BMW 3 Series. The gearbox is older version of the second generation ZF 8HP50 currently fitted to the competing Alfa Romeo Giulia model. A six-speed ZF manual gearbox is available on diesel models.

The XE uses a traction control system marketed as All Surface Progress Control, developed from the Terrain Response system fitted to Land Rover's off-road vehicles and allowing better traction in snow and ice.

Security and Safety
Jaguar expected the XE to obtain a five star Euro NCAP safety rating which was proven in 2015.  The design features several safety features now mandatory to be considered for a five star rating, including the Advanced Emergency Braking System (pre-crash system).

The XE was tested by Thatcham's New Vehicle Security Ratings (NVSR) organisation and achieved the following ratings:

SV Project 8
A special limited-production, high-performance version of the XE called SV Project 8 debuted at the 2017 Goodwood Festival of Speed. The base car was modified by Jaguar Land Rover's Special Vehicle Operations (SVO) team, with carbon fibre body panels and aerodynamic aids including a front splitter and rear wing, carbon fibre and Alcantara interior trim, 400 mm carbon ceramic brake discs in front with six-piston calipers, unique 20-inch wheels with Michelin Sport Cup 2 tires, and a supercharged and intercooled 592 hp version of the 5.0 L Jaguar AJ-V8.

In the typical trim the Project 8 has four leather-trimmed bucket seats, with the two front seats mounted on lightweight magnesium frames. A "track package", not available in the United States, features a harness retention hoop in place of the rear seats, and carbon fibre racing seats with four-point competition harnesses installed in the front.

Total production is limited to 300 worldwide.

Worldwide sales

Gallery

References

External links

XE
Cars introduced in 2015
Compact executive cars
Sports sedans
Rear-wheel-drive vehicles
All-wheel-drive vehicles
Euro NCAP large family cars
2010s cars